Volchy-Vtoroy is a rural locality (a khutor) in Volokonovsky District, Belgorod Oblast, Russia. The population was 60 as of 2010. There is 1 street.

Geography 
Volchy-Vtoroy is located 28 km west of Volokonovka (the district's administrative centre) by road. Volchya Alexandrovka is the nearest rural locality.

References 

Rural localities in Volokonovsky District